The 2011 FIBA Europe Under-20 Championship for Women was the 10th edition of the FIBA Europe Under-20 Championship for Women. 16 teams featured the competition, held in Serbia from July 7–17. Spain won the championship.

Participating teams

  (Winners, 2010 FIBA Europe Under-20 Championship for Women Division B)

  (Runners-up, 2010 FIBA Europe Under-20 Championship for Women Division B)

Preliminary round
In this round, the sixteen teams were allocated in four groups of four teams each. The top three qualified for the Qualifying Round. The last team of each group played for the 13th–16th place in the Classification Games.

Group A

Group B

Group C

Group D

Qualifying round
The twelve teams remaining will be allocated in two groups of six teams each. The four top teams advance to the quarterfinals. The last two teams of each group play for the 9th–12th place.

Group E

Group F

Classification round
The last teams of each group in the Preliminary Round will compete in this Classification Round. The four teams will play in one group. The last two teams will be relegated to Division B for the next season.

Group G

Knockout round

9th–12th playoffs

9th–12th semifinals

11th place playoff

9th place playoff

5th–8th playoffs

5th–8th semifinals

7th place playoff

5th place playoff

Championship

Quarterfinals

Semifinals

Bronze-medal game

Final

Final standings

External links
Official Site

2011
2011–12 in European women's basketball
2011–12 in Serbian basketball
International women's basketball competitions hosted by Serbia
International youth basketball competitions hosted by Serbia
Sports competitions in Novi Sad
Sport in Zrenjanin
2011 in youth sport
21st century in Novi Sad
July 2011 sports events in Europe